On 14 December 2022, a migrant boat capsized in the English Channel killing at least 4 people.

Background

Reference

December 2022 events in the United Kingdom
2022 disasters in the United Kingdom
Maritime incidents in 2022
Maritime incidents in England
Migrant boat disasters in Europe
Shipwrecks in the English Channel
History of the English Channel